John Bush may refer to:

Music
Johnny Bush (1935–2020), American country music singer
John Bush (singer) (born 1963), American metal vocalist for Armored Saint and Anthrax

Public life
John Bush (English politician), MP for Cambridge 1411 and 1426
John Bush (High Sheriff) (c. 1745–?), High Sheriff of Oxfordshire
John T. Bush (1811–1888), member of the New York State Senate
John E. Bush (Hawaii politician) (1842–1906), Governor of Kauai
John Barnard Bush (born 1937), Lord Lieutenant of Wiltshire from 2004 to 2012
Jeb Bush or John Ellis Bush (born 1953), former governor of Florida

Other people
John Bush (provincial soldier), African American provincial soldier during the French-Indian Wars in North America
John Bush (admiral of Siam) (1819–1905), English sea captain who worked for the Siamese Government
John E. Bush (Mosaic Templars of America) (1856–1916), co-founder of the Mosaic Templars of America
John Bush (New Zealand cricketer) (1867–1913)
Jack Bush or John Hamilton Bush (1909–1977), Canadian painter
John Bush (Royal Navy officer) (1914–2013), British Royal Navy officer
John Bush (English cricketer) (1928–2015)
John K. Bush (born 1964), United States Circuit Judge for the Sixth Circuit since 2017
John Bush (filmmaker), filmmaker, cinematographer, and visual artist
John Bush (set decorator), see Academy Award for Best Production Design

See also
Jon Busch (born 1976), American soccer player
Jonathan Bush (Jonathan James Bush, 1931–2021), American banker and political fundraiser
Jonathan S. Bush (born 1969), American health care businessman
Jonathan Bushe (born 1978), Irish cricketer